Malpighia harrisii is a species of flowering plant in the family Malpighiaceae, that is endemic to Jamaica.

References

Further reading

harrisii
Plants described in 1913
Vulnerable plants
Endemic flora of Jamaica
Taxonomy articles created by Polbot